Back from the Dead is the fifth album by American death metal band Obituary. It was released on April 22, 1997. This was the band's final album before their six-year breakup from 1997 to 2003.

Back from the Dead was the first Obituary album not produced by longtime contributor Scott Burns. Some copies of the album also include an additional CD-ROM Data containing videos, live footage and animation.

Track listing
All tracks written and composed by Obituary, unless otherwise stated.

Personnel
John Tardy - vocals
Allen West - lead guitar
Trevor Peres - rhythm guitar, CD-ROM bonus data
Frank Watkins - bass
Donald Tardy - drums

References

External links
Back from the Dead at Media Club

1997 albums
Obituary (band) albums
Roadrunner Records albums